The 1984 United States presidential election in Maine took place on November 6, 1984. All fifty states and the District of Columbia, were part of the 1984 United States presidential election. Voters chose four electors to the Electoral College, which selected the president and vice president of the United States. Maine was won by incumbent United States President Ronald Reagan of California, who was running against former Vice President Walter Mondale of Minnesota. Reagan ran for a second time with former C.I.A. Director George H. W. Bush of Texas, and Mondale ran with Representative Geraldine Ferraro of New York, the first major female candidate for the vice presidency.

The presidential election of 1984 was a very partisan election for Maine, with more than 99% of the electorate voting either Democratic or Republican, and only four parties appearing on the ballot. Every county in Maine voted for Reagan by a double-digit margin, a strong performance in a historically Republican-leaning state that had trended Democratic since the 1960s. Reagan became the first Republican to win industrialized, Catholic French-Canadian Androscoggin County since Dwight D. Eisenhower in 1956. Reagan enjoyed high levels of bipartisan support, with many registered Democrats voting for him (Reagan Democrats) for his association with the economic recovery, his strong stance on national security issues with the Soviet Union, and the perception that the Democratic platform "support[ed] American poor and minorities at the expense of the middle class."

Even amidst a national Republican landslide, Maine weighed in as almost 4% more Republican than the national average. This election marked something of a high water mark for Republicans in Maine; no candidate of either party has since come close to Reagan's vote share or margin, and the state at-large has subsequently only voted Republican once more (in the following election of 1988). Despite Reagan's success in 1984, the subsequent and rapid decline of the Republican Party in Maine and other liberal New England states has been attributed in part to the broader party adopting the conservative policies that Reagan championed, in what the president described as the "second American Revolution."

Results

Results by congressional district
Reagan won both of Maine's congressional districts.

Results by county

See also
 United States presidential elections in Maine
 Presidency of Ronald Reagan

References

Maine
1984
1984 Maine elections